The 2010 AMA Pro Daytona Sportbike Championship was the second running of the AMA Daytona Sportbike Championship, an American motorcycle racing series that acts as a feeder series for the AMA Pro American Superbike Championship. Title sponsors for the series include Sunoco, Amsoil, National Guard, Dunlop, Speedcom and SunTrust.

Martín Cárdenas won his first championship riding a Suzuki.

Calendar

Season standings

Riders' standings

Manufacture standings

Entry List

See also
 2010 AMA Pro American Superbike Championship
 2010 AMA Pro Supersport Championship

References

External links
 The official website of the AMA Pro Racing Championship

AMA Pro Daytona Sportbike
AMA Pro Daytona Sportbike Championship